Wanted is a 2010 Bengali-language Indian action thriller film, directed by Ravi Kinagi, starring Jeet and Srabanti Chatterjee in the lead roles. The film is a remake of 2005 Telugu superhit film Athadu starring Mahesh Babu and Trisha Krishnan.

Plot
Rajkumar Banerjee /Raja (Jeet) and Joy (Indrajit Chakraborty) are professional assassins and partners. They charge Rs. 15 million per assassination.

Amarnath Ganguly is a party leader and wants to stage his own attempted assassination to garner the sympathy vote in the upcoming election. His colleague Shubhankar Banerjee (Biplab Chatterjee) hooks him up with Raja. Ganguly is killed by someone else. Police immediately surround the skyscraper. Raja is about the exit the building when there is a car accident with his car. Raja assumes that Joy has died in the accident. Raja goes to the top of the building with the police in pursuit. A passing train offers Raja an escape with a rope to land on the train.

Raja meets Shibu (Atanu Mukherjee) who reveals that he ran away from his village, Ganganagar, when he was young; he is now returning to his village. The police site Raja but shoot Shibu. Raja escapes to Ganganagar. Shibhu's family believes Raja to be their son and accepts him.

A CBI officer, Salim Ali Khan (Sharad Kapoor) is investigating Ganguly's murder, believes that Raja is responsible, and comes across the Raja/Shibu connection. He tries getting "Raja's" fingerprints but is outsmarted. Clues implicate Joy.

There is in Ganganagar a wedding of "Shibu's" niece, the CBI comes to believe there has been a Raja/Shibu change, and Raga is a murder suspect. Raja flees, the CBI leave, and he returns to explain what is going on. The family shows no interest in helping Raja to find the real assassin but his grandfather (Biswajit Chakraborty) gives Raja a gun.

Raja calls Shubhankar Banerjee and demands to know who killed Ganguly. Banerjee refuses but Raja tells him that their conversation has been recorded, and Banerjee reveals everything. Joy killed Ganguly for Rs. 20 million. He faked his death by sending a drunkard in the car at the time of the accident. Raja leaves for the old church, where Joy is. Raja and Joy meet and Raja has the gun loaded before Joy. But the same policemen who killed Shibu barge in. Raja kills them all, including Joy. Raja gives the recording to the CBI officer. The CBI officer goes directly to Banerjee's office, tells him that he will hand him over to the police, and Banerjee tells him that he has no concrete evidence. The CBI officer reveals the recording is evidence enough for Ganguly's hot headed son, who has vowed vengeance for his father's death. Trapped without any recourse, Banerjee commits suicide. Raja released Shibu's ashes and the CBI officer lets him go to Shibu's family, where he stays forever.

Cast
 Jeet as Rajkumar Banerjee (Raja)/Shibu
 Srabanti Chatterjee as Pooja
 Sharad Kapoor as CBI Officer Salim Ali Khan
 Biplab Chatterjee as Shubhankar Banerjee
 Atanu Mukherjee as Shibranjan Chowdhury (Shibu)
 Biswajit Chakraborty as Siddhartha Narayan Choudhury
 Kamalika Banerjee as Shibu's mother
 Indrajit Chakraborty as Joy
 Joy Badlani as Sadhu
 Kharaj Mukherjee as Shibu's uncle
 Aritra Dutta Banik
 Rajat Ganguly as Minister Amarnath Ganguly, who plans to become Chief Minister 
 Shyamal Dutta as CBI Chief

Soundtrack
This movie has five songs.
The album is composed by Rajesh Roy for Wanted.

Critical response
Jeet proves once again that he is a seasoned actor who has only got better with time. Srabanti looks cute as the chulbuli Pooja, who falls hook, line and sinker for Raja whom she assumes to be gramer paliye jaoya chhele, Shibu. Kharaj does a fabulous job as the funnyman and even before he opened his mouth, the audience was in splits. Another surprise in the film comes in the form of Sharad Kapoor aka Salim Khan, the CBI officer whose only weakness is good-looking women. His character too is well-etched out and adds that extra zing to the narrative."

References

External links
 

Bengali-language Indian films
2010 films
2010s Bengali-language films
Films scored by Rajesh Roy
Bengali remakes of Telugu films
Indian action thriller films
Films about contract killing in India
2010 action thriller films